Paramorpha marginata is a species of moth in the family Carposinidae. It is endemic to New Zealand and has been observed in the northern parts of the North Island. It has been observed in the canopy of kanuka forest and has been collected and reared from leaf litter beneath Leucopogon fasciculatus. It is regarded as a rarely recorded species.

Taxonomy 
This species was described by Alfred Philpott in 1931 using a specimen collected by Charles E. Clarke at Okoroire in December and named Carposina marginata. Later in 1931 Edward Meyrick, thinking he was describing a new species, named it Paramorpha heptacentra. This name along with the original combination were synonymised by George Hudson in his 1939 book A supplement to the butterflies and moths of New Zealand. Hudson illustrated and described the species  under the current nomenclature.  The male holotype specimen is held at the Auckland War Memorial Museum.

Description 

Philpott described the species as follows:

Distribution 
This species is endemic to New Zealand. Hudson was of the opinion that the species could be found in the northern parts of the North island. Other than Okoroire, this species has been collected in Albany in Auckland,  Whangarei, and at the Poor Knights Islands.

Biology and behaviour 
This species is on the wing in December and January. This species has been collected using a malaise trap as well as being beaten from foliage. This species is regarded as being rarely recorded.

Habitat and host species 
This moth has been found to be present in the canopy of kanuka stands. P. marginata has been collected and reared from litter beneath Leucopogon fasciculatus.

References

Carposinidae
Moths of New Zealand
Endemic fauna of New Zealand
Moths described in 1931
Taxa named by Alfred Philpott
Endemic moths of New Zealand